Lorengecora is a settlement in the Northern Region of Uganda. It is the headquarters of Lorengecora Parish, in Iriri sub-county, in Bokora County, in Napak District, in the Karamoja sub-region.

Location
The geographical coordinates of Lorengecora Town Council are 02°14'04.0"N, 34°15'57.0"E (Latitude:2.234444; Longitude:34.265833).

Overview
Lorengecora Town Council was created, effective 14 July 2011. In 2015, a study carried out by a non-government organisation, called African Network for the Prevention and Protection against Child Abuse and Neglect (ANPPCAN), on the streets of Kampala, found that 57 percent of all Kampala street children come from the Karamoja sub-region. Also, 44 percent of the same cohort, come from Napak District.

Efforts to resettle the nomadic children back in their home area, have focused in Lorengecora Town Council, where attempts are made to enroll in school and house the returnees at Kobulin Resettlement Camp in Napak District.

See also
Karamoja
Bokora Corridor Wildlife Reserve

References

External links
 Napak District: Hazard, Risk And Vulnerability Profile As At August 2014

Populated places in Uganda
Cities in the Great Rift Valley
Napak District